Gu is a Chinese family name. Some places such as South Korea, and early immigrants from Wu-speaking region in China usually romanize this family name as "Koo" or "Ku". It is the 93rd name on the Hundred Family Surnames poem.

The family name Gù is the most common pronounced "Gu", as well as the only one pronounced "Gù" (Mandarin 4th tone) and is ranked #88 on the list of top Chinese family names, according to the 2006 Chinese census (excluding Taiwan).

History

China

Northern lineage
The surname Gu ("顾") descends from the kings of the first hereditary dynasty in China, Xia dynasty. A branch of the royal family was given a domain or a subsidiary kingdom with this name near the capital of Xia dynasty. On the way of taking over from Xia dynasty, the second dynasty, Shang dynasty, first attacked and annexed the subsidiary kingdom with this surname and another subsidiary kingdom named "Wei" ("韦") of Xia dynasty.  The survivors of the former subsidiary kingdom adopted the name and became the northern lineage of the family Gu.

Southern lineage
The founder king of Xia dynasty, Yu the Great, died in Kuaiji ("会稽"), nowadays Shaoxing (“绍兴”), on his last imperial inspection tour, and was buried there ("禹穴"). During the reign of Xia dynasty, a branch of the royal family - which may or may not be the same branch of the subsidiary kingdom as mentioned above - was dispatched to Kuaiji ("会稽") to take care of the burial site ("禹穴") of the founder king, Yu the Great, and memorial rites commemorating the king. This branch evolved into Yue Kingdom around or possibly before the Spring and Autumn period in the third dynasty Zhou dynasty, as unearthed second dynasty Shang dynasty oracle bone already contemporaneously indicates the presence of a domain or kingdom named Yue. An ancestor of the Gu family was the most famous king of this Yue Kingdom, Goujian. He was the last of the five Hegemons in the historic Spring and Autumn period, and had an incredibly beautiful sword unearthed in near mint condition several decades ago.

A second, southern lineage of the family Gu descends from this branch, although they technically did not obtain that name until the Han dynasty. The Southern lineage of Gu family makes up the majority of all those who bear the name today. A book of family tree was published.

The Gu family traces its origins to the Yue Kingdom, which was later destroyed around 306 BC in the third dynasty Zhou dynasty during the Warring States period and partitioned between Chu and Qi. At the beginning of the Han dynasty, the 7th generation descendant of King Goujian of Yue was named Yao, a regional warlord. He assisted the royal family of the Han dynasty in establishing the new dynasty. For his service, the Han emperor rewarded Yao with the title of "King of Eastern Sea". Yao later bestowed his own son the title of "Duke of Gu Yu". Thus his descendants proclaimed themselves the last name "Gu", and called "Gu Yao" as the 1st Ancestor of "Gu".

According to a 2002 article similar trace of that family was confirmed through historical archives. Other commentaries are found at and

Distribution
This family name can be found mostly in eastern and southern Chinese provinces, especially in Jiangsu, Northern Zhejiang, and around the city of Shanghai, and is sometimes romanized as Koo. This surname can also be found in Korea, Vietnam and Indonesia.

Notable people

Chinese
Prominent bearer of this surname include:
 The Gu clan of Wu, whose members served under the warlord Sun Quan in the late Eastern Han dynasty and later in the state of Eastern Wu during the Three Kingdoms period
 Gu Yong, second chancellor of Eastern Wu
 Gu Hui, Gu Yong's brother, served under Sun Quan
 Gu Ti, official of Eastern Wu
 Gu Shao, Gu Yong's eldest son, official of Eastern Wu
 Gu Tan, Gu Shao's son, official of Eastern Wu
 Gu Cheng, Gu Shao's son, official of Eastern Wu
 Gu Rong (:zh:顧榮; 顾荣), Gu Yong's grandson, served Jin dynasty after the fall of Eastern Wu, was a trusted advisor to Emperor Yuan of Jin, led established southern nobility to unite with exiled northern nobility, and played a pivotal role in preserving the Chinese civilization in a most precarious period - Invasion and rebellion of the Five Barbarians - culminated with the Disaster of Yongjia
 Gu Kaizhi, celebrated painter of ancient China during the Jin dynasty
 Gu Yanwu, a scholar in late Ming and early Qing period
 Wellington Koo (Gu Weijun), the diplomat who represented China in the League of Nations
 Gu Jiegang, the modern Chinese historian who advocated a modern view of China as a diverse culture, rather than the traditional homogeneous culture
 Ku Meng-yu, Vice Premier of the Republic of China (1948)
 Matthias Gu Zheng (simplified Chinese: 顾征; traditional Chinese: 顧征; pinyin: Gù Zhēng; born 17 February 1937) is a Chinese Catholic priest
 Gu Cheng (顾城; 1956 – 1993) a Chinese modern poet
 Gu Hongzhong (顾闳中; 937 – 975) was a Chinese painter during the Five Dynasties and Ten Kingdoms period of Chinese history.
 Gu Shunzhang (顾顺章, 1903 – 1934), also known as Gu Fengming, born in Baoshan, Shanghai, was a leader of the Chinese Communist Party (CCP).
 Gu Zhutong (simplified Chinese: 顾祝同, pinyin: Gù Zhùtòng; 1893 – 1987), courtesy name Moshan (墨山), was a military general and administrator of the Republic of China
 Gu Ruzhang or Ku Yu-cheung (simplified Chinese: 顾汝章; pinyin: Gù Rǔzhāng; 1894–1952) was a Chinese martial artist who disseminated the Bak Siu Lum (Northern Shaolin) martial arts system across southern China in the early 20th century. Selected by the Central Guoshu Institute to teach Northern martial arts to the South as one of the "Five Southbound Tigers".
 Gu Jingzhou (顾景舟; 1915 – 1996) was a Chinese ceramic artist who specialised in the creation of zisha-ware teapots. He was a founder and Deputy Director of Research and Technology at the Number One Yixing Factory.
 Joseph Gu (顾约瑟) was former senior pastor of the Chongyi Church in Hangzhou, one of the largest churches in China today, and former head of the Zhejiang Christian Council
 Gu Kuang (顧況) (fl. 757) was a Tang dynasty poet.
 Gu Jun (simplified Chinese: 顾俊, 1975 –) was a Chinese badminton player in the 1990s from Wuxi, Jiangsu
 Gu Hengbo, Gu Mei, (Chinese: 顧媚; Wade–Giles: Ku Mei; 1619 – 1664), better known by her art name Gu Hengbo (Chinese: 顧橫波; Wade–Giles: Ku Heng-po), also known as Xu Mei and Xu Zhizhu after her marriage, was a Chinese courtesan, poet and painter
 Gu Zhongchen (顧忠琛; pinyin: Gù Zhōngchēn; 1860 – July 31, 1945) was a military leader and politician at the end of Qing dynasty and in the early Republic of China
 Gu Deng (顾澄; 1882 - 1947?) was a mathematician and politician at the end of Qing dynasty and in the early Republic of China. His courtesy name was Yangwu (養捂)
 Gu Yanhui (顧彥暉) (d. November 16 897) was a warlord late in the Chinese dynasty Tang dynasty
 Gu Changsheng (顾长声; 1919 – 2015) Chinese scholar of the history of Christianity in China
 Gu Fangzhou (顾方舟；1926 – 2019) Chinese virologist who eradicated polio in China
 Gu Yuan (顾原; 1982 –) female hammer thrower from PR China
 Gu Xingqing (顧杏卿, c. 1894 – ?) Chinese interpreter and writer who wrote the only book-length account of World War I by a Chinese national

Korean

 Koo Bon-moo (1945–2018), South Korean business executive
 Koo Cha-kyung (1925–2019), South Korean business executive
 Changmo, South Korean rapper and producer
 Goo Hara, South Korean singer and actress, member of girl group Kara
 Koo In-hwoi (1906–1969), South Korean businessman
 Koo Ja-cheol, South Korean footballer
 Koo Junhoe, South Korean singer, member of boy band iKon
 Younghoe Koo, Korean-American gridiron football placekicker

References

 http://www.taiwan.cn/zppd/XSDG/200901/t20090106_811068.htm 中国最新300大姓排名（2008）" [300 most common surnames in China (2008)] (in Chinese). Taiwan.cn. 2009-01-06. Retrieved 2018-05-13.

Chinese-language surnames
Korean-language surnames
Individual Chinese surnames